Synchronicity is Bennie K's third album.

Track listing
CD Track List:
 Synchroni-city ~Opening~ 
 Oasis feat. Diggy-MO' (Soul'd Out) (オアシス) 
 Treasure 
 Sunrise (サンライズ) 
 Okay　　 
 Stay Awhile ~Interlude~ 
 1 4 3 ~Yuki's Room~ 
 Draculea ~Cico's Castle~ 
 Benkei & Ushiwakamaru (弁慶&牛若丸) 
 Tengu VS Benkei feat. Sea-Mo Nator (シーモネーター) (天狗VS弁慶)　 
 Puppy Love feat. Gipper (Nora) 
 Lost Paradise feat. Tsuyoshi　 
 Sunday"after"noon

Charts 
Oricon Sales Chart (Japan)

Total sold: 341,626

Bennie K albums
2004 albums